The Lewis Blue is an album by Scottish Celtic musicians Ivan Drever and Duncan Chisholm, released in 1998. At the time, both musicians were members of Wolfstone (though Drever left shortly after The Lewis Blue'''s release).

The album was released around the same time as the controversial album release This Strange Place, which was essentially an Ivan Drever piece with certain members of Wolfstone, but after a short period of time in 1998, it was marketed as a Wolfstone album.  At the time, many fans noted that The Lewis Blue was "the Wolfstone album of 1998, not This Strange Place".

Track listing
"The Flower of Kristiansand" - 4:19
"Snowdrops in the Rain" - 3:28
"Fiddle Reels" - 4:00
"Maggie's Pancakes"
"The Little Cascade"
"Leaving the Harbour" - 3:26
"Night in That Land" - 3:20
"Three Jigs" - 3:28
"Sonny Brogan's"
"Burke's"
"Trip to Leverkusen"
"The Battle of Falkirk" - 4:10
"Bonnie Lindsay" - 3:43
"Warm Embrace" - 3:06
"Two Reels : The Ramnee Ceilidh" - 2:58
"The Lewis Blue" - 3:32

See also
This Strange Place
Farrar

1998 albums
Duncan Chisholm albums
Wolfstone albums